Niemierzyce  is a village in the administrative district of Gmina Granowo, within Grodzisk Wielkopolski County, Greater Poland Voivodeship, in west-central Poland.

References

Niemierzyce